Tianji.com (Chinese: 天际网) was a Chinese professional social networking website. Tianji stopped operations on December 27, 2015.

History
Tianji was founded in 2005 by CEO Derek Ling. It joined Viadeo in 2008. In 2010-11, it started entering a period of explosive growth, attracting over 380,000 users per month.

Purpose
Tianji was a professional social networking website, in a similar fashion to LinkedIn. According to CEO Derek Ling, Tianji focused on a group of Chinese professionals who are younger than 40 but have also graduated from college, a demographic that adds value through its existing contacts and work experience. By 2013 the site was predicted to have 35 million users.

Statistics
Tianjin claimed up to over 15 million users, according to its website. The website also claimed that there were over 37,000 executive searchers on the website, and that 90% of users report successful communication with managers and businesspeople.

References

External links
https://web.archive.org/web/20130929020812/http://www.tianji.com/

Chinese social networking websites